The Take Out Move is a 2022 American comedy film written and directed by Andrew Simonian and starring Nick Grace, Jeremy Sless, and Alexandra Miles.

Freestyle Digital Media acquired North American rights to The Take Out Move and released the film across digital and VOD platforms on September 13, 2022.

Made for only $3,500, the film is Simonian's first full-length feature and is based on his 1997 short film of the same name.  The film was shot in 4K on a Panasonic Lumix GH5 DSLR.  It was filmed in and around Los Angeles.

Simonian included his parody book, "Bi-Curious George", in a brief scene in the movie.

The Take Out Move earned positive review, including a 9-out-of-10 score from Film Threat which called it "A delightful, very humorous tale expertly brought to life by a talented cast and crew. Plus, the ending is too perfect for words!" and four-stars from MovieReviews101 which said "Amazing creativity! Proves you can make great entertainment on a micro-budget!".

Plot summary 
When a shadowy figure instructs two different men to take out the same woman, they both end up at her home at the same time and must fight each other through absurd situations to be the one to complete the assignment.

Cast 
 Nick Grace as Davis
 Jeremy Sless as Whalen
 Alexandra Miles as Amber
 Zack Kozlow as Mr. Fanst
 Kaia Placa as Coffee Shop Girl

Festivals and Awards

Festival awards and nominations 
 Best Feature Film - Winner at the 2021 Rome International Movie Awards (Italy).
 Best Comedy Feature - Winner at the 2021 Hong Kong Indie Film Festival (Hong Kong).
 Best Comedy Feature - Winner at the 2021 Midwest Action Fest film festival (United States).
Best Feature Film - Winner at the 2021 Poor Life Choices Comedy Film Festival (United States).
 Best Film - Winner at the 2021 Reel Comedy Fest film festival (United States).
 Best First Time Feature - Winner at the 2021 Philadelphia Independent Film Festival (United States).
 Best Comedy Feature - Winner at the 2021 Kyiv Film Festival (Ukraine).
 Best Feature Film Silver - Winner at the 2021 Dark Comedy Film Festival (United States).
 Best Midnight Film - Winner at the 2021 Cult Critic Movie Awards (India).
 Best Feature Film, Made For Less Than $5000 - Winner at the Monkey Bread Tree Film Awards (United Kingdom).
 Best Narrative Feature Silver - Winner at the 2021 Virgin Springs Cinefest (India).
 Best Actor, Jeremy Sless - Winner at the 2021 Reel Comedy Fest film festival (United States).
 Best Director Finalist at the 2021 Lit Laughs International Comedy Film Festival (United Kingdom).
 Best Feature Finalist at the 2021 Lit Laughs International Comedy Film Festival (United Kingdom).
 Best Directorial Debut Nominee at the 2021 ME Film Festival (United States).
 Best Editing Nominee at the 2021 Reel Comedy Fest film festival (United States).
 Best Actor Nominee, Nick Grace, at the 2021 Reel Comedy Fest film festival (United States).
 Best Director Nominee at the 2021 Maverick Movie Awards (United States).
 Best Editing Nominee at the 2021 Maverick Movie Awards (United States).
 Best Music Nominee at the 2021 Maverick Movie Awards (United States).
 Best Ensemble Performance Nominee at the 2021 Maverick Movie Awards (United States).
 Best Feature Finalist at the 2021 Vancouver Independent Film Festival (Canada).
 Best Feature Semi-Finalist at the 2021 GELOS Comedy Film Festival (Russia).
 Official Selection at the 2021 New York Flash Film Festival (United States).
 Official Selection at the 2021 CKF International Film Festival (United Kingdom)
 Official Selection at the 2021 Toronto Independent Film Festival of Cift (Canada).
 Official Selection at the 2021 Kansas City FilmFest International (United States).
 Official Selection at the 2021 Austin International Art Festival (United States).
 Official Selection at the 2021 Calgary Independent Film Festival (Canada).
 Official Selection at the 2021 Malibu Film Festival (United States.)
 Official Selection at the 2021 Maracay International Film & Video Festival (Venezuela).
Official Selection at the 2021 Spring Grove Caledonia Film Festival (United States).
 Official Selection at the 2021 Arpa International Film Festival (United States).

References

External links 
 The Take Out Move on Rotten Tomatoes
 
The Take Out Move Official Website
The Take Out Move Official Trailer

2022 comedy films